Statistics of Belgian First Division in the 1896–97 season.

Overview

It was contested by 6 teams, and Racing Club de Bruxelles won the championship.

League standings

Results

See also
1896–97 in Belgian football

References

1896
1896–97 in European association football leagues
1896–97 in Belgian football